Andrew Bibby (born 24 October 1980 in Sydney) is an Australian former actor who played Lance Wilkinson on the Australian soap opera Neighbours in 1995, 1996–2001, 2005 and in 2022. He returned again briefly in 2018.

Early and personal life
He went to Maranatha Christian School in Endeavour Hills, Melbourne, Victoria. After being accepted to both NIDA and WAAPA, he moved to Perth and studied acting at WAAPA between 2001 and 2003.

Bibby has three children.

Brother of 2x MNEG Champion Daniel Bibby

Career
In 1996 he appeared in the Australian romantic comedy film, Hotel de Love, alongside Aden Young, Saffron Burrows and Simon Bossell.

Bibby worked for the Bell Shakespeare company in 2004 and also featured in several advertisements including the Zoo Weekly ad, and has previously been on the St. George Bank ad. In 2005 he performed in the play, The Fire Raisers at the Old Fitzroy Theatre. Bibby featured in the 2007 Australian short film, DisPretty, by Stephanine Bates.

In August 2008, Bibby played the role of Fairbanks for the Australian premiere of the one man show Radio by Al Smith at the Old Fitzroy Theatre.
He played the principal role in Ross Mueller's No Man's Island (2–27 June 2009) directed by Travis Green and "Barnum" in the Australian premiere of How to Act Around Cops by Logan Brown and Matthew Benjamin at the Darlinghurst Theatre, directed by Leland Kean.

In 2010 he appeared in the ABC kids series My Place and had a recurring role in Underbelly: The Golden Mile.

He is a founding member and associate artist of Shaman Productions, based in Sydney

Bibby is a much loved Intensive Care Paramedic and Acting Inspector  based at the Kogarah Ambulance Station.

Filmography
 Computer Kids – television movie (1994)
 A Country Practice – television series (1994)
 Blue Heelers – television series (1994)
 Ocean Girl – television series (1995)
 Hotel de Love (1996)
 Neighbours – television series (1995–2001, 2005, 2018, 2022)
 DisPretty (2007)
 All Saints – television series (2008)
 My Place – television series (2009)
 Underbelly: The Golden Mile – television series (2010)

References

External links

1980 births
Living people
Australian male child actors
Australian male soap opera actors
Male actors from Sydney
Western Australian Academy of Performing Arts alumni